The 2021–22 Texas–Rio Grande Valley Vaqueros women's basketball team represents the University of Texas Rio Grande Valley during the 2021–22 NCAA Division I women's basketball season. Lane Lord is in his fourth season as UTRGV's head coach. The Vaqueros play their home games at the UTRGV Fieldhouse and are members of the Western Athletic Conference.

Roster

Schedule

|-
!colspan=9 style=| Exhibition

|-
!colspan=9 style=| Non–conference regular schedule

|-
!colspan=9 style=| WAC conference schedule

|-
!colspan=9 style=|WAC Tournament

See also
2021–22 Texas–Rio Grande Valley Vaqueros men's basketball team

References

UT Rio Grande Valley Vaqueros women's basketball seasons
Texas-Rio Grande Valley
Texas-Rio Grande Valley
Texas-Rio Grande Valley